Stewart is a city in McLeod County, Minnesota, United States. The population was 571 at the 2010 census.

History
Stewart was platted in 1888 by Dr. D. A. Stewart, and named for him. Stewart was incorporated in 1888.

Geography

U.S. Highway 212 serves as a main route in the city.

Stewart is very flat, being located on the eastern edge of the Great Plains.

Demographics

2010 census
As of the census of 2010, there were 571 people, 235 households, and 152 families living in the city. The racial makeup of the city was 97.4% White, 0.2% Asian, 1.8% from other races, and 0.7% from two or more races. Hispanic or Latino of any race were 4.2% of the population.

There were 235 households, of which 31.1% had children under the age of 18 living with them, 46.8% were married couples living together, 9.4% had a female householder with no husband present, 8.5% had a male householder with no wife present, and 35.3% were non-families. 28.9% of all households were made up of individuals, and 11.5% had someone living alone who was 65 years of age or older. The average household size was 2.43 and the average family size was 2.93.

The median age in the city was 39.3 years. 24% of residents were under the age of 18; 8.9% were between the ages of 18 and 24; 24.9% were from 25 to 44; 30.9% were from 45 to 64; and 11.4% were 65 years of age or older. The gender makeup of the city was 50.8% male and 49.2% female.

2000 census
As of the census of 2000, there were 564 people, 241 households, and 146 families living in the city. The racial makeup of the city was 98.58% White, 0.18% Asian, and 1.24% from two or more races. Hispanic or Latino of any race were 1.77% of the population.

There were 241 households, out of which 35.3% had children under the age of 18 living with them, 48.1% were married couples living together, 9.5% had a female householder with no husband present, and 39.4% were non-families. 34.9% of all households were made up of individuals, and 16.6% had someone living alone who was 65 years of age or older.  The average household size was 2.34 and the average family size was 3.05.

In the city, the population was spread out, with 27.3% under the age of 18, 8.5% from 18 to 24, 29.3% from 25 to 44, 19.3% from 45 to 64, and 15.6% who were 65 years of age or older.  The median age was 35 years. For every 100 females, there were 109.7 males.  For every 100 females age 18 and over, there were 99.0 males.

The median income for a household in the city was $38,542, and the median income for a family was $42,222. Males had a median income of $28,864 versus $23,036 for females. The per capita income for the city was $16,512.  About 4.6% of families and 7.1% of the population were below the poverty line, including 1.3% of those under age 18 and 26.9% of those age 65 or over.

References

Cities in McLeod County, Minnesota
Cities in Minnesota